68th meridian may refer to:

68th meridian east, a line of longitude east of the Greenwich Meridian
68th meridian west, a line of longitude west of the Greenwich Meridian